Baa Bega Chandamama is a 2008 Indian Kannada-language action drama film directed by Murali (brother of Sudha Rani) in his directorial debut and starring Deepak and Suhasini. The story is based on The Comedy of Errors. The film's title is based on a line from the song "Amara Madhura Prema" in Rathnagiri Rahasya (1957). The film was a box office failure.

Cast 
Deepak as Deepu
Suhasini as Preethi
Avinash as Poonacha
Bullet Prakash as Prakash
Jai Jagadish
Chitra Shenoy

Soundtrack 
The music for the film was composed by Murali.

Reception 
A critic from Bangalore Mirror wrote that "Uninspired performances, unintelligent placement of songs and the unnecessary length of the film tests one’s patience. A critic from Rediff.com wrote that "All in all, Baa Bega Chandamama is a no show". A critic from IANS wrote that "Baa Bega Chandamama is an illogical film which lacks excitement in narration". A critic from Filmibeat praised the performances of actors except Deepak while criticised the film's story.

References